Karel Willem Hendrik Gleenewinkel Kamperdijk (October 30, 1883 in Haarlem - June 20, 1975 in Rijswijk) was a Dutch football player.

Gleenewinkel Kamperdijk played for HBS Craeyenhout in the early years of the 20th century. He was part of the first Netherlands national football team, in the 1905-04-30 match against Belgium (4-1 victory). Two weeks later, Gleenewinkel Kamperdijk was part of the squad again, in the return game against Belgium on 1905-05-14, in Rotterdam (4-0 victory). These would remain the only caps of his career.

Gleenewinkel Kamperdijk married Christina Carolina Albertina Fehr on 1910-09-08. They had two daughters together, Vera Paulina Adolphina (1911-1984) and Wilhelmina Laura (1913-1991). The couple divorced on 1919-12-16.

References

1883 births
1975 deaths
Dutch footballers
Netherlands international footballers
Footballers from Haarlem
HBS Craeyenhout players
Association footballers not categorized by position